Machiara National Park is a Pakistani national park near Muzaffarabad. 

Establedd in 1996, the park is located at 34' -31’ N latitude and 73' -37’ E longitude. River Neelum, and Neelum valley are on its eastern side while the Kaghan Valley is on the west.

The park covers an area of 33,437 acres. It contains evergreen broadleaved forests and deciduous broad-leaved woodlands and forms a part of Western Himalayan Broadleaf forest region; a Global 200 Ecoregion. The average rainfall is 1526.7 mm per year. The month receiving most rainfall is July, November is the one with the least rainfall.

It was notified in 1996 as a National Park.

References

National parks of Pakistan
Geography of Azad Kashmir
Tourist attractions in Azad Kashmir